Dillwynella fallax is a species of sea snail, a marine gastropod mollusk in the family Skeneidae.

Description
The size of the shell attains 4 mm.

Distribution
This marine species occurs off Japan and in the East China Sea.

References

 Higo, S., Callomon, P. & Goto, Y. (1999). Catalogue and bibliography of the marine shell-bearing Mollusca of Japan. Osaka. : Elle Scientific Publications. 749 pp.

External links
 
 To World Register of Marine Species

fallax
Gastropods described in 1997